Spain sent a delegation to compete at the 2008 Summer Paralympics in Beijing. The country's delegation consisted of 232 people, including 133 athletes competing in 15 sports. Attending the opening ceremony on September 6 was Infanta Elena, President of the Spanish Paralympic Committee Miguel Carballeda, Minister Mercedes Cabrera, and several representatives from the Madrid Olympic Games Bidding Committee.

Medals

Sports

Archery

Men

|-
|align=left|Manuel Candela
|align=left rowspan=2|Men's individual recurve W1/W2
|582
|17
|L 87-96
|colspan=5|Did not advance
|-
|align=left|Jose Manuel Marin
|557
|24
|L 88-102
|colspan=5|Did not advance
|-
|align=left|Antonio Sanchez
|align=left rowspan=2|Men's individual recurve standing
|571
|19
|L 88-97
|colspan=5|Did not advance
|-
|align=left|Juan Miguel Zarzuela
|602
|9
|W 97-90
|W 98-97
|L 95-102
|colspan=3|Did not advance
|-
|align=left|Manuel Candela Antonio Sanchez Juan Miguel Zarzuela
|align=left|Men's team recurve
|1755
|5
|colspan=2 
|L 183-188
|colspan=3|Did not advance
|}

Athletics

Men's track

Men's field

Women's track

Women's field

Boccia

Individual

Pairs / team events

Cycling

Men's road

Men's track

Women's road

Women's track

Football 5-a-side

The men's football 5-a-side team didn't win any medals; they were defeated by Argentina in the bronze medal match by penalties.

Players
Adolfo Acosta Rodriguez
Vicente Aguilar Carmona
Alfredo Cuadrado
Pedro Garcia Villa
Carmelo Garrido Alarcon
Jose Manuel Gomez
Alvaro Gonzalez Alcaraz
Antonio Martin Gaitan
Marcelo Rosado Carrasco

Tournament

Bronze medal match

Goalball

The men's goalball team didn't win any medals; they were 12th out of 12 teams.

Players
Vicente Galiana
Jose Fernando Garcia
Raul Garcia
Jose Perez
Tomas Rubio
Jesus Nazaret Santana Guillen

Tournament

11/12th classification

Judo

Men

Women

Powerlifting

Women

Rowing

Sailing

Shooting

Men

Swimming

Men

Women

Table tennis

Men

Teams

Wheelchair fencing

Men

Women

Wheelchair tennis

Men

Women

See also
2008 Summer Paralympics
Spain at the Paralympics
Spain at the 2008 Summer Olympics

External links
Beijing 2008 Paralympic Games Official Site
International Paralympic Committee

References

Nations at the 2008 Summer Paralympics
2008
Paralympics